Denizköy VLF transmitter, also known as Bafa transmitter, is a facility of US Navy for military VLF transmission near Denizköy in Didim district of Aydın Province, Turkey, at 37°24'43"N 27°19'25"E. The facility situated at Denizköy uses two 472m metres tall guyed masts, which are the tallest man-made structures in Turkey. The transmitter is active on 26700 Hz under the callsign TBB.

See also
 List of tallest structures in Turkey

Towers in Turkey
Didim District
Military radio systems of the United States
Radio masts and towers
Military installations of the United States in Turkey